Narasimha Satakam is a compilation of 100 poems by Seshappa.
They are primarily based on devotion and morality and set in simple language.

Compilation of this complete work is in Telugu Wikisource.

See also
 Simhadri Narasimha Satakam, written by Gogulapati Kurmanatha Kavi

Further reading
1.Narasimha Satakamu at AVKF
2.Narasimha Satakamu: Sheshappa Balasaraswathi Book Depot, Eighth edition, 1977, Madras.

Indian poetry collections
Vaishnava texts
Telugu poetry